Uralosuchus is an extinct genus of temnospondyl amphibian from the Late Permian of Russia, belonging to the group Archegosauroidea. It is a member of the archegosauroidean subfamily Melosaurinae. Fossils have been found in Orenburg Oblast. Uralosuchus was named in 1993 with the description of the type species U. tverdochlebovae.

Phylogeny
Below is a cladogram modified from Ruta et al. (2007) showing the relationship of Uralosuchus to other archegosauroids:

References

Permian temnospondyls
Fossils of Russia
Prehistoric amphibian genera